B10 cells are a sub-class of regulatory B-cells (Breg cell) that are involved in inhibiting immune responses in both humans and mice. B10 cells are named for their ability to produce inhibitory interleukin: Interleukin-10 (IL-10). One of their unique abilities is that they suppress the innate and adaptive immune signals, making them important for regulating the inflammatory response. Like the B-cell, the B10 cell requires antigen specific binding to the surface of CD5 receptor to illicit a response from the T-cell. Once an antigen binds to the CD19 receptor, immediate downregulation in B-cell antigen receptor (BCR) signal expression occurs and mediates the release of IL-10 cytokines.

History 
The B10 cell was first characterized in 2008, as a different subset of B-cells in mice. By inducing hypersensitive T-cells the immune response of the mice were over reactive. When compared to the wild type or normal expression of antigen receptors, the B-cells bound to CD19 molecules actually decreased inflammation. The in vivo model demonstrated that a new characterization of B-cell was producing IL-10 which was later defined as the B10 effector cells.

References 

B cells